is a Japanese manga artist from Tsubame, Niigata. Nananan is famous for her realistic josei work featuring understated artwork with a sense of detachment. In addition, she has affiliated herself with the "La nouvelle manga" movement. Her first work was published in Garo in 1993.  Three of her works have been made into live-action movies: Blue (2001), Strawberry Shortcakes (2006), and Pumpkin and Mayonnaise (2017). At the Angoulême International Comics Festival 2008, she won the Prix de l'école supérieure de l'image.

Style 
Kiriko Nananan says she is obsessed with seeing everything in-between the lines. She uses the spaces in the panels/the backgrounds, as characters to suggest feelings such as hope or emptiness. It is for this reason that, unlike most manga artists, she will not have assistants do the details for her, since the little details play an important role in her stories. She draws each panel so that it can be isolated, like a picture on a poster or T-shirt, rather than drawing/thinking of her manga as a series of boxes. When she draws each panel, she says she sometimes will take even four hours on just one, repeating the same picture dozens of times.

Nananan says her stories and characters are only partially fictional, and believe they are all true-to-life. She bases the way the characters think on how she thinks, then links everything together with fictional events. She feels she can't have writing assistants either since she is the only one who can tell her stories.

Acting Credits

Works
 Water - short stories / Magazine House, 1996 / 
 Blue / Magazine House, 1997 / 
 Itaitashii Love (痛々しいラヴ ) - short stories / Magazine House, 1997 / 
 Haruchin (ハルチン) - one-page gag serial / Magazine House, 1998 / 
 Kabocha to Mayonnaise (aka Pumpkin and Mayonnaise, aka Everyday) (南瓜とマヨネーズ ) - short stories / Takarajimasha, 1999 / 
 Strawberry shortcakes (aka Sweet Cream & Red Strawberries) / Shodensha, 2002 / 
 Tanpenshû (短編集 ) - short stories / Asuka Shinsha, 2003 /

Film adaptations 

 2001: Blue (after Blue, 1997)
 2006: Strawberry Shortcakes (after Strawberry Shortcakes, 2002)
 2017: Pumpkin and Mayonnaise (after Kabocha to Mayonnaise, 1999)

Notes

External links

1972 births
Manga artists from Niigata Prefecture
Women manga artists
Living people
People from Tsubame, Niigata
Japanese female comics artists
Female comics writers
20th-century Japanese women writers
21st-century Japanese women writers